Boothman is a surname. Notable people with the surname include:

Achille Boothman (1939–2018), Irish hurler
George Boothman (1916–2003), Canadian ice hockey centrer
Henry Boothman (1875–1953), British trade union leader
Jack Boothman (1935–2016), 31st president of the Gaelic Athletic Association 
Jack Boothman (footballer), (1906–1989), Australian rules footballer
John Boothman (1901–1957), Royal Air Force officer
Mark Boothman (born 1977), Australian politician
Melvin M. Boothman (1846–1904), U.S. Representative from Ohio
Nicholas Boothman (born 1946), English author and speaker
Peter Boothman (1943–2012), Australian jazz guitarist, composer and educator